A referendum on the Federation of Arab Republics was held in Egypt on 1 September 1971, alongside simultaneous referendums in Libya and Syria. It was approved by 99.96% of voters, with a turnout of 98.1%.

Results

References

1971 in Egypt
Egypt
Federation of Arab Republics
Referendums in Egypt
September 1971 events in Africa